Los Hermanos Dalton is a Spanish pop-rock indie band from San Fernando, Cadiz. The name comes from the Lucky Luke's characters, The Dalton's brothers.

Discography 
 Luces de Hollywood (MiniLP Covers). Mad Man Records, 1991.
 Ya están aquí. Dro, 1992.
 Nada suena igual (MiniLP). Dro East West, 1994.
 Vitamina D. Dro East West, 1996.
 Crash. Dro East West, 1998.
 Una noche más (en directo). Dro East West, 2000.
 Esperando una señal, Mad Man Records 2009.

 Singles 
 Los latidos de siempre. Dro East West, 1993.
 El crimen del siglo. Dro East West, 1993.
 El mejor lugar. Dro East West, 1993.
 Nada suena igual. Dro East West, 1994.
 Pink Panter. Dro East West, 1994.
 Canciones Animadas. Dro East West, 1995.
 Provitamina D. Dro East West, 1996.
 Qué gran día. Dro East West, 1996.
 Fred Flintstone. Dro East West, 1996. Sin moverte del sillón. Dro East West, 1996.
 Perdiendo el tiempo. Dro East West, 1998.
 Espejos que no devuelven las miradas. Dro East West, 1999.
 Mucho mejor''. Dro East West, 2000.

External links 
 Myspace. Los Hermanos Dalton
 Facebook. Los Hermanos Dalton

Spanish rock music groups